Myrlin Hermes (born September 22, 1975) is an American author.  She has written two books, Careful What You Wish For and The Lunatic, the Lover, and the Poet. She was born in California, but raised in India and Hawaii. Furthermore, she attended Reed College, and received her Master's from Royal Holloway at the University of London. Likewise, she currently lives in Portland, Oregon.

Hermes appeared as a contestant on the U.S. quiz show Jeopardy! in an episode airing February 2, 2021.

References

External links
Author web page
Review from OregonLive

1975 births
Living people
Reed College alumni
Writers from Portland, Oregon
Alumni of the University of London
Lambda Literary Award winners
20th-century American novelists
21st-century American novelists
American women novelists
20th-century American women writers
21st-century American women writers
Novelists from Oregon